The Fulham by-election, in Fulham, on 10 April 1986 was held following the death of the Conservative Member of Parliament (MP) Martin Stevens on 10 January that year. In a seat that had changed hands on a few occasions, it was won by Nick Raynsford of Labour, only to be regained by the Tories in the general election 14 months later.

Candidates
Jane Birdwood was a veteran activist on the far right who was variously associated with the National Front and British National Party.
James "Boyd" Black advocated the right of Northern Ireland to directly elect its own government and was a leading member of the British and Irish Communist Organisation.
Matthew Carrington captured the seat for the Conservatives at the following election.
John Creighton was the owner of a local wine shop.
Liza Duke called for the abolition of Parliament.
Roger Liddle later went on to become an adviser to Tony Blair and Peter Mandelson.
Nick Raynsford would later return to Parliament as MP for Greenwich and Greenwich & Woolwich.
Rev. Geoffrey Rolph represented the Fellowship Party, which supported pacifism and opposed nuclear power.
Reginald Simmerson, a regular by-election candidate, campaigned against British membership of the European Community. Following his death in 1998 the Anti-Common Market League established a prize in his memory.
Jon Swinden ran for the Humanist Party which advocates the humanism of Mario Rodríguez Cobos.
David Sutch was the founder and leader of the Official Monster Raving Loony Party.

Results

External links
Results

References

1986 elections in the United Kingdom
April 1986 events in the United Kingdom
By-elections to the Parliament of the United Kingdom in London constituencies
Elections in the London Borough of Hammersmith and Fulham
1986 in London
Fulham